Bagou Township (Mandarin: 巴沟乡) is a township under the jurisdiction of Tongde County, Hainan Tibetan Autonomous Prefecture, Qinghai, China. In 2010, Bagou Township had a total population of 8,140: 4,111 males and 4,029 females: 1,844 under 14, 5,811 aged between 15 and 64 and 445 over 65 years old.

References 

Township-level divisions of Qinghai
Tongde County